Utricularia triloba is a small annual, terrestrial carnivorous plant that belongs to the genus Utricularia (family Lentibulariaceae). It is native to Central and South America and is found in the following countries: Argentina, Belize, Bolivia, Brazil, Colombia, French Guiana, Guyana, Paraguay, Peru, Suriname, and Venezuela.

See also 
 List of Utricularia species

References 

Carnivorous plants of Central America
Carnivorous plants of South America
Flora of Argentina
Flora of Belize
Flora of Bolivia
Flora of Brazil
Flora of Colombia
Flora of French Guiana
Flora of Guyana
Flora of Paraguay
Flora of Peru
Flora of Suriname
Flora of Venezuela
triloba